Mecyclothorax discedens is a species of ground beetle in the subfamily Psydrinae. It was described by Sharp in 1903.

References

discedens
Beetles described in 1903